Mrs Mac's Pies is an Australian food company manufacturing meat pies sold throughout Australia and New Zealand and produced in Perth, Western Australia.

History
In the 1950s Ken Macgregor started up a small business in Melbourne manufacturing cakes, yeast buns and pies. By 1954, the owner had moved his family to Perth and restarted his wholesale business as "Bakewell Pies". The business moved to its Morley site in 1968 and the next generation of the family, Iain Macgregor became the new owner of the business. In the late 1980s, the business had seen vast growth in distribution, new technology and products developed and the company rebranded to the Mrs Mac's name.

In February 2015, Mrs Mac's appointed Paul Slaughter as CEO. In February 2021, Jonathan Moss took over as CEO after Slaughter left the company.

Mrs Mac's was acquired by Aus Pie Co in November 2022.

Products
The Mrs Mac's range grew in 2016 with the introduction of Gluten Free.

Mrs Mac's Good Eating range has gained the Heart Foundation Tick of Approval, Healthy Kids Amber Rating and FOCiS Approval for a number of their products.

Mrs Mac's has attained BRC accreditation. BRC is a global food safety system standard based on HACCP principles (Hazard Analysis and Critical Control Point) and Good Manufacturing Practices to ensure production of safe quality product. The system is third party audited on regular basis in addition to other specific customer and retailer audits.

Marketing
Mrs Mac's has undertaken various advertising campaigns over the years. In 2007, Mrs Mac's launched the slow food campaign, encouraging consumers to see its products as something best eaten in moderation and in a family environment.
 
In 2010, Mrs Mac's launched a new look with new packaging, advertising, social media and promotions driving the tagline "If it's not a Mrs Mac's, take it back!"

In 2014, Mrs Mac's underwent a rebrand. On the back of it, a series of online content was produced highlighting use of 100% Aussie beef, hand-checking was a quality measure and that their pastry was made the old-fashioned way. They also brought the 'show' on the road with the Roadtrip campaign and the radio Nova Team.

See also
Australian meat pie

References

Australian brands
Australian pies
Brand name pies
Bakeries of Australia
Privately held companies of Australia